Madrid  is a city in Douglas Township, Boone County, Iowa, United States. The population was 2,802 at the time of the 2020 census. It is part of the Boone, Iowa Micropolitan Statistical Area, which is a part of the larger Ames-Boone, Iowa Combined Statistical Area.

Geography
Madrid is located at  (41.875435, −93.819931).

History

Madrid was a small coal mining community during the winter and a farming community during the summer. Mining became a larger part of its economy as time went on. Initially, coal was used locally for winter heating, hence the reason for it being considered a part-time job by most residents. The Carpenter Coal Company opened a mine between Madrid and Woodward in 1901, and the Reese Brothers Coal Company opened two mine shafts near Madrid. The Carpenter Brothers named their coal camp Scandia, and changed their corporate name to match.  By 1914, The Scandia Coal Company of Madrid produced over 100,000 tons of coal per year, ranking among the top 24 coal producers in the state.  In 1912, Locals 709 and 2460 of the United Mine Workers union, both based in Madrid, had an aggregate membership of 397, representing about 1/3 of the total population in 1910.

Madrid gained a large Italian and Croatian population who worked in its coal mines during the 1920s and 1930s. In 2017 the town was featured in an episode of Madrid de sol a sol, a show from Spanish public channel Telemadrid exploring locations named "Madrid". (Madrid is Spain's capital.)

Public safety
Madrid is served by a volunteer fire department, as well as a police department.

Demographics

2010 census
As of the census of 2010, there were 2,543 people, 1,045 households, and 682 families residing in the city. The racial makeup of the city was 98.6% White, 0.2% African American, 0.1% Native American, 0.1% Asian, 0.2% from other races, and 0.8% from two or more races. Hispanic or Latino of any race were 0.8% of the population.

There were 1,045 households, of which 32.5% had children under the age of 18 living with them, 51.6% were married couples living together, 10.3% had a female householder with no husband present, 3.3% had a male householder with no wife present, and 34.7% were non-families. 29.8% of all households were made up of individuals, and 13.4% had someone living alone who was 65 years of age or older. The average household size was 2.33 and the average family size was 2.88.

The median age in the city was 40.2 years. 24.7% of residents were under the age of 18; 5.8% were between the ages of 18 and 24; 25.5% were from 25 to 44; 24.3% were from 45 to 64; and 19.8% were 65 years of age or older. The gender makeup of the city was 47.1% male and 52.9% female.

2000 census
As of the census of 2000, there were 2,264 people, 914 households, and 637 families residing in the city. The racial makeup of the city was 99.20% White, 0.09% Native American, 0.22% Asian, 0.13% from other races, and 0.35% from two or more races. Hispanic or Latino of any race were 1.19% of the population.

There were 914 households, out of which 33.2% had children under the age of 18 living with them, 58.5% were married couples living together, 8.1% had a female householder with no husband present, and 30.3% were non-families. 26.5% of all households were made up of individuals, and 13.3% had someone living alone who was 65 years of age or older. The average household size was 2.48 and the average family size was 3.00.

26.2% are under the age of 18, 9.2% from 18 to 24, 28.6% from 25 to 44, 20.5% from 45 to 64, and 15.4% who were 65 years of age or older. The median age was 36 years. For every 100 females, there were 98.1 males. For every 100 females age 18 and over, there were 92.8 males.

The median income for a household in the city was $39,706, and the median income for a family was $47,596. Males had a median income of $33,889 versus $26,173 for females. The per capita income for the city was $24,576. About 5.6% of families and 7.8% of the population were below the poverty line, including 12.2% of those under age 18 and 5.6% of those age 65 or over.

Points of interest
 Hindu Temple & Cultural Center of Iowa
 Snus Hill Winery
 Iowa Arboretum
 Swede Point Park
 Madrid Historical Museum
 High Trestle Trail
 Madrid High School

Notable person
 Dick Jensen: Member of the famous 1969-70 Iowa Hawkeyes men's basketball team
 Thatcher Johnson: Iowa Deputy Secretary of Agriculture, Candidate for IA Secretary of State (1980), and Candidate for IA Secretary of Agriculture (1986)

References

External links

 
City-Data Comprehensive Statistical Data and more about Madrid

Cities in Boone County, Iowa
Cities in Iowa
Populated places established in 1846
Swedish-American culture in Iowa
1846 establishments in Iowa Territory